Dorothy Christy (born Dorothea J. Seltzer, later Dorothy Rucker; May 26, 1906 – May 21, 1977) was an American actress. She was sometimes billed as Dorothy Christie.

Early years
Christy was born Dorothea J. Seltzer on May 26, 1906, in Reading, Pennsylvania. She was the daughter of Mr. and Mrs. John C. Seltzer. Although she sometimes participated in amateur plays, she had no plans for an acting career. After attended public schools in Reading, she went to Beachwood (a finishing school near Philadelphia) and then to Dana Hall School near Boston. She went on to study opera.

Career 
On Broadway, Christy was a member of the ensemble of The New Moon (1928) and portrayed Olive in Follow Thru (1929).

Christy acted with Will Rogers, Buster Keaton and the Marx Brothers (appearing in the pre-filming stage version of A Night at the Opera) and with Stan Laurel and Oliver Hardy in the film Sons of the Desert (1933), in the role of Mrs. Laurel. She was Queen Tika of Murania in The Phantom Empire, Gene Autry’s 1935 cliffhanger serial. She concluded her cinema career in 1953.

Personal life and death 
On January 2, 1936, Christy was divorced from songwriter Hal Christy.

Christy died of natural causes five days shy of her seventy-first birthday.

Selected filmography
 So This Is London (1930)
 She Got What She Wanted (1930)
 Playboy of Paris (1930)
 Big Money (1930)
 Extravagance (1930)
 Free Love (1930)
 Parlor, Bedroom and Bath (1931) (credited as Dorothy Christie)
 Big Business Girl (1931)
 Caught Cheating (1931)
 The Devil Plays (1931)
 Convicted (1931)
 Forbidden Company (1932)
 The Arm of the Law (1932)
 Shop Angel (1932)
 Sons of the Desert (1933) as Mrs. Betty Laurel
 Love Birds (1934)
 Bright Eyes (1934)
 One Exciting Adventure (1934)
 Man from Cheyenne (1942)
 The Magnificent Rogue (1946)
 The Pilgrim Lady (1947)
 So Big (1953)

References

External links

 
 Dorothy Christy
 

1906 births
1977 deaths
American film actresses
American silent film actresses
American stage actresses
Hal Roach Studios actors
Actresses from Pennsylvania
20th-century American actresses